Dave Currie (19 May 1876 – 20 April 1912) was an  Australian rules footballer who played with Essendon in the Victorian Football League (VFL).

Notes

External links 
		

1876 births
1912 deaths
Australian rules footballers from Melbourne
Essendon Football Club players
People from North Melbourne